Svetlan Stoev (born 30 August 1960) is a Bulgarian diplomat. Since 12 May 2021, he is the Minister of Foreign Affairs in the interim government of Stefan Yanev.

Biography 
Svetlan Stoev was born on 30 August 1960 in Sofia. In 1985, he graduated with a degree in "International Relations" at the University of National and World Economy (UNSE). Later, he obtained a master's degree, as well as specializations in international economic relations (in Moscow in 1990-1992) and "European institutions and policies" at the Diplomatic Academy "Gustav Stresemann" (In Bonn in 1998).

As well as his native Bulgarian, he speaks English, German and Russian.

References 

Foreign ministers of Bulgaria
Bulgarian diplomats
1960 births
Living people